Adénúgà is a surname of Yoruba origin, meaning "the crown or royalty has a foundation or throne room". Notable people with the surname include:

 Jamie Adenuga, stage-named Jme (musician), English grime artist
 Joseph Adenuga, stage-named Skepta, English rapper
 Julie Adenuga, English radio presenter
 Mike Adenuga, Nigerian business tycoon
 Victor Adenuga Oyenuga, Nigerian agricultural scientist
 Wale Adenuga, Nigerian cartoonist

Yoruba-language surnames